Danaus petilia, the lesser wanderer,  is a species of butterfly in the nymphalid Danainae subfamily. It is a migratory species which is found in Australia and in tropical countries. Previously considered a subspecies of Danaus chrysippus, this species came about through allopatric speciation. The deep sea barrier called Lydekker's Line, located by the Molluccas and the Sahul Shelf, was what separated Danaus petilia from Danaus chrysippus cratippus. Its caterpillars feed on native and introduced cotton bush species.

A common butterfly with nomadic populations, particularly in central Australia where many native host plants die of during dry periods, and in south eastern Australia where it is too cold for them in winter. Butterflies prefer an open country or farmland habitat. Flight is generally slow and close to the ground.

Host plants 
Host plants include of a range of native and introduced plants that have a milky sap like Gomphocarpus, Cynanchum, Secamone, Marsdenia, Ascelpias, Calotropis, Stapelia and many more.

References

Further reading
 Ackery, P. R. & Vane-Wright, R. I. (1984). Milkweed butterflies. London: British Museum (Natural History).

External links

Danaus (butterfly)
Butterflies described in 1790